Forestiera pubescens, commonly known as stretchberry, desert olive, tanglewood, devil's elbow, elbow bush, spring goldenglow, spring herald, New Mexico privet, or Texas forsythia is a deciduous shrub or small tree native to the southwestern United States (Texas, Oklahoma, New Mexico, Arizona, Colorado, Utah, Nevada, California) and northern Mexico.

References

External links
Southwest Colorado Wildflowers
Photo gallery

pubescens
Flora of Northeastern Mexico
Flora of Northwestern Mexico
Flora of the Southwestern United States
Flora of the California desert regions
Flora of the Great Basin
Plants described in 1837
North American desert flora
Flora without expected TNC conservation status